Pseudohypoaldosteronism (PHA) is a condition that mimics hypoaldosteronism. However, the condition is due to a failure of response to aldosterone, and levels of aldosterone are actually elevated, due to a lack of feedback inhibition.

Types

Presentation
PHA2 is clinically characterised by hypertension, hyperkalaemia, metabolic acidosis and normal renal function.

Mechanism
PHA2 is also known as familial hyperkalaemic hypertension, or Gordon syndrome.  The underlying genetic defect leads to increased sodium chloride reabsorption in the distal tubule in the kidney, leading to volume expansion, hypertension and lowered renin levels. The hyperkalemia found in PHA2 is proposed to be a function of diminished sodium delivery to the cortical collecting tubule (potassium excretion is mediated by the renal outer medullary potassium channel ROMK in which sodium reabsorption plays a role). Alternatively, WNK4 mutations that result in a gain of function of the Na-Cl co-transporter may inhibit ROMK activity resulting in hyperkalemia. Unlike in PHA1 in which aldosterone resistance is present, in PHA2 the volume expansion leads to relatively low aldosterone levels.

Treatment
Treatment of severe forms of PHA1 requires relatively large amounts of sodium chloride.
These conditions also involve hyperkalemia.

In contrast, PHA2 (Gordon's syndrome) requires salt restriction and use of thiazide diuretics to block sodium chloride reabsorption and normalise blood pressure and serum potassium.

History
This syndrome was first described by Cheek and Perry in 1958.
Later pediatric endocrinologist Aaron Hanukoglu reported that there are two independent forms of PHA with different inheritance patterns: A renal form with autosomal dominant inheritance exhibiting salt loss mainly from the kidneys, and a multi-system form with autosomal recessive form exhibiting salt loss from kidney, lung, and sweat and salivary glands.

The hereditary lack of responsiveness to aldosterone could be due to at least two possibilities: 1. A mutation in the mineralocorticoid receptor that binds aldosterone, or 2. A mutation in a gene that is regulated by aldosterone. Linkage analysis on patients with the severe form of PHA excluded the possibility of linkage of the disease with the mineralocorticoid receptor gene region. Later, the severe form of PHA was discovered to be due to mutations in the genes SCNN1A, SCNN1B, and SCNN1G that code for the epithelial sodium channel subunits, α, β, and γ, respectively.

A stop mutation in the SCNN1A gene has been shown to be associated with female infertility.

See also 
 Hyperchloremic acidosis
 Pseudohyperaldosteronism

References

External links 
  GeneReviews/NCBI/NIH/UW entry on Pseudohypoaldosteronism Type II

Transcription factor deficiencies
Nephrology
Pediatrics
Channelopathies
Rare diseases